The 1902 Andijan earthquake occurred on December 16 with a surface wave magnitude of 6.4 and a maximum perceived Mercalli intensity of IX (Violent). The shock claimed between 700 and 4,880 casualties and more than 40,000 homes were destroyed in the Andijan Region of Uzbekistan.

See also
 List of earthquakes in 1902

References

Andijan earthquake, 1902
Earthquakes in Uzbekistan
December 1902 events
1902 in Asia
20th century in Uzbekistan
1902 disasters in Asia
1902 disasters in the Russian Empire
1902 in the Russian Empire